= Textbookrental.ca =

- Company type: Private
- Founded: 2010
- Headquarters: Toronto, Ontario, Canada
- Key people: Brandon Luft CEO, Gershon Hurwitz Co-founder, Mike Stock Co-founder.
- Industry: Technology Education
- Products: Online textbook rental.
- Website: http://www.textbookrental.ca/

Textbookrental.ca is a textbook rental service company, based in Canada. Its services include textbook rentals, used textbook sales, a buyback program, and instore kiosks in university bookstores.

== History ==
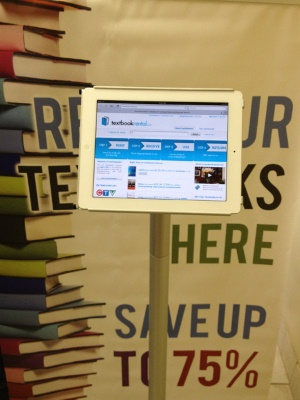
Textbookrental.ca in store Kiosk

Textbookrental.ca was established in 2010 by entrepreneurs Gershon Hurwitz and Mike Stock, in response to student concerns about the rising cost of textbooks. By 2011, the online store was selling textbooks at a discount and renting texts, allowing searching by textbook ISBN, author, and title, selecting a 2, 3, or 6 month (semester) rental period, and shipping options. Once the semester is over, books are returned with a free return shipping label, or in person at 11 depots.

The company also set up a service to buy back used books, either by paying cash for books dropped off at a depot location near campus, by providing a free shipping label from the website to ship the books to the company.

In 2013, Textbookrental.ca raised $415,000 of seed funding, mainly from Seek Capital, to expand its business. In 2014 it continues to be privately owned and is managed by the founders together with an executive team.

== Partnerships ==
Textbookrental.ca has teamed up with Conestoga college Ontario to provide students with an online rental option. Students can rent their textbooks online 24 hours a day. Later the company made arrangements with other colleges, including Lakehead and Dalhousie. In British Columbia, the website collaborates with campusconnected.ca, a student classified ad website. Textbookrental.ca has partnered with Indigo to provide online rentals and second hand books.
